TU8 – Soviet, later Russian diesel locomotive for gauge .

History
The TU8 was developed in 1987 – 1988 at the Kambarka Engineering Works to replace the ageing locomotive classes TU6A. The cab is equipped with efficient heat-system, refrigerator, radio-set and air conditioning.

Series locomotives
The diesel locomotive TU8 (ТУ8) has been used as the basis of three other locomotives:
 TU8G (ТУ8Г)
 TU8P (ТУ8П)
 TU6SPA (ТУ6СПА) mobile power station

Additional specifications
Distance between bogies – 4,000 mm
Base of bogies – 1,400 mm

Gallery

See also
Kambarka Engineering Works

References

External links

 Series locomotives (Russian language)
 TU8 diesel locomotive (Russian language)

750 mm gauge locomotives
3 ft 6 in gauge locomotives
Diesel locomotives of the Soviet Union
Diesel locomotives of Russia
Diesel locomotives of Estonia
Diesel locomotives of Vietnam
Diesel locomotives of Ukraine